Sky Deutschland GmbH, branded as Sky, is a German media company that operates a direct broadcast satellite Pay TV platform in Germany, Austria and Switzerland (through Sky Switzerland). It provides a collection of basic and premium digital subscription television channels of different categories via satellite and cable television.

It was launched in 1991 as Premiere. The channel originally started as a single analogue channel on the Astra 1A satellite, showing films dubbed into German, as well as in original audio, live football matches from the German Bundesliga and Austrian Bundesliga (and at one time the UEFA Cup), and documentaries and TV series. After the coming of the digital age, the service has since consisted of many channels with many new ones added over the years. On 4 July 2009, the service and its channels were rebranded as "Sky".

Sky Deutschland is a wholly owned subsidiary of Comcast-owned Sky. The programming service itself is provided by its subsidiary Sky Deutschland Fernsehen GmbH & Co. KG (formerly Premiere Fernsehen GmbH & Co. KG). It topped 3,000,000 subscribers by the end of 2011. As of Q2 2014, Sky Deutschland has more than 4 million subscribers.

History 

The German Sky has its origin in the analogue premium channel Premiere. It was owned by Kirch Group, Bertelsmann, and Canal+, and started broadcasting in 1991.

In 1996, Kirch Media launched a digital satellite platform called DF1, which offered several different channels, including premium movie and sports channels and basically, thematic channels.

Premiere started broadcasting three digital channels in 1997, one channel mirroring the analogue channel and two showing the same content at different times.

Premiere and DF1 merged to form Premiere World on 1 October 1999. Many of the channels offered on DF1 were carried over to Premiere World, others were rebranded or closed.

In 2002, the service became known as simply Premiere. Many of the channels were rebranded and the package structure was overhauled at the same time. At the same time, KirchGroup filed for bankruptcy. In 2003, investment group Permira stepped in and took control of Premiere; two years later it launched an initial public offering for €1.2 billion.

Exclusivity was for a long time a major selling point for Premiere, and most of its channels were only available through the Premiere platform. This changed in September 2007, when Premiere launched Premiere Star, a new satellite package made up of channels that were not exclusive to Premiere. The new package was called Sky Welt/Extra. The package included TNT Serie, TNT Film, Sat.1 emotions, Kabel eins Classics, AXN, Kinowelt.TV, RTL Living, RTL Crime, FOX, Syfy Universal, Animax, Disney Junior, Disney XD, Boomerang, Cartoon Network, ESPN America, Eurosport HD, Eurosport 2, National Geographic Channel, Discovery Channel, MTV Germany, MTV Live HD and Nicktoons.

In January 2008, News Corporation bought a 14.6% of Premiere. News Corporation increased its shares of Premiere in the following months. On 4 July 2009, Premiere was rebranded, becoming Sky Deutschland. In conjunction with the relaunch, many channels disappeared from the platform, switched packages or were renamed. Several new channels were also added. The rebrand marked the return of News Corporation's Sky brand to Germany since the encryption of the Sky Channel (now Sky One) in 1993, apart from the availability of Sky News.

Sky also sells it services to pubs, restaurants, hotels and other establishments. The services are marketed by Sky Business.

Following News Corporation's split on 28 June 2013 to create two separate companies, 21st Century Fox (the rebranded News Corporation), and the spin-off company New News Corp, the 54.5% stake held by News Corporation in Sky Deutschland was retained by the rebranded 21st Century Fox.

Following media speculation, on 12 May 2014 Sky Deutschland's sister company, BSkyB, confirmed that it was in talks with its largest shareholder, 21st Century Fox, about acquiring Fox's 57.4% stake in Sky Deutschland and its 100% stake in Sky Italia. The enlarged company would be likely to be called "Sky Europe" and it will consolidate 21st Century Fox's European digital TV assets into one company. The acquisition of the 57.4% stake was formally announced on 25 July 2014. BSkyB also made a required takeover offer to Sky Deutschland's minority shareholders. This resulted in BSkyB acquiring 89.71% of Sky Deutschland's share capital in total. The acquisitions were completed on 13 November. British Sky Broadcasting Group plc changed its name to Sky plc on 21 November 2014. On 27 November 2014 Sky plc increased its shareholding in Sky Deutschland to 90.04%, and by 2015 had bought out the remaining shareholders, de-listing the company from the Frankfurt stock exchange.

On 17 November 2016, Sky Deutschland and WWE signed a multiyear agreement to distribute WWE's premier pay-per-view events and broadcast  Raw and SmackDown live on Sky Sports starting in April 2017.

In May 2017, Sky Deutschland acquired Homedia, operator of the Swiss over-the-top streaming company Hollystar. Sky subsequently launched Sky Sport as an OTT service in Switzerland, followed by an OTT entertainment service known as Sky Show in 2018. Services in Switzerland are handled by Sky Switzerland, a wholly owned subsidiary of Sky Deutschland.

In September 2017, Sky Deutschland extended its multi-year satellite capacity deal with satellite operator SES for seven transponders at the 19.2°E orbital position, confirming its long-term commitment to satellite delivery of services.

In June 2022, the name was changed to "WOW."

Channels 

The channels that make up the Sky package broadcast from the Astra 19.2°E satellite position, using the Astra 1H, Astra 1L, and Astra 1M satellites. All channels are available in SD and separate HD channels.

Between 2004 and 2016, they were uplinked by SES Platform Services (later MX1, now part of SES Video); channels are now uplinked by Sky Italia. SES Video (formerly MX1) provide backup transmission services.

Current 
Sky One
Sky Replay
Sky Atlantic
Sky Cinema
Sky Cinema Premieren
Sky Cinema Premieren +24
Sky Cinema Hits
Sky Cinema Action
Sky Cinema Fun
Sky Cinema Family
Sky Cinema Best of
Sky Krimi
Sky News UK
Sky Sport 1-14 (1 UHD channel)
Sky Sport News HD 
Sky Sport Austria
Sky Sport Bundesliga 1-9 (1 UHD channel)
Sky Comedy
Sky Crime
Sky Documentaries
Sky Nature
Sky Showcase

Defunct 

Sky 3D (defunct, 1 July 2017)
Sky Info (defunct)
Sky Sport Fanzone (defunct, 25 June 2017)
Sky Arts (on-demand only, linear channel defunct 3 April 2019)
Sky Select 1-10 (ad-hoc NVOD / pay-per-view channels)

On 29 November 2018, 14 SD feeds were closed on Astra 19.2 satellite: Disney Junior, Beate-Uhse.TV, National Geographic, Discovery Channel, 13th Street, Fox, TNT Series, Syfy, NatGeo Wild, Spiegel Geschichte, Sky 1, TNT Film, Disney Cinemagic and Sky Atlantic. The SD switch-off is part of a major transponder reorganisation by Sky Deutschland on 29 November on the Astra satellite.

Encryption 
VideoGuard is used as conditional access system.

Bone conduction advertising abuse 
In mid 2013, the company considered using bone conduction via train windows to broadcast ads to train riders.

References

External links 

Mass media companies established in 2009
2009 establishments in Germany
 
Sky Group
Direct broadcast satellite services
German-language television networks
Television stations in Germany
Mass media in Munich